Video Jukebox may refer to:
 
 Video Jukebox, an American television program that aired from 1981 to 1986 on  Home Box Office (HBO).
 Video Jukebox Network, a cable, satellite and UHF broadcast Florida television service.
 YouTube Jukebox, a free service for creating playlists of YouTube videos, especially music.

As a general term in English, video jukebox may refer to:

 A device for playing music in a bar, etc. equipped with an electronic screen for selection and display.
 A video playback system connected to a telecommunication network in order to transmit films to consumers on demand.
 The presentation of videos in a media player on a website, along the lines of YouTube.
 In slang: any small electronic device that can record and play back music, such as an iPod. 
 The Scopitone, a jukebox which played 16mm films.